The Sheltering Desert is a 1992 drama film directed by Regardt van den Bergh and starring Jason Connery, Rupert Graves and Joss Ackland. The film was a co-production between Ireland, South Africa and the United Kingdom. It is listed in the movie list of the British production company Vine International Pictures Ltd.

The Sheltering Desert is also the name of the book the film is based upon. It is an autobiographical account written by Henno Martin. Its original German title is "Wenn es Krieg gibt, gehen wir in die Wüste". The English as well as the German edition are published by the German publisher Two Books.

Plot summary
In 1935, two German geologists, Henno Martin and Hermann Korn, leave Nazi Germany for South-West Africa (Namibia) to conduct field research. At the outbreak of the Second World War, many male Germans living in South-West Africa are interned in local camps. As pacifists the two German scientists refuse to be arrested and flee into the Namib Desert. They live for over two years in the vastness of the desert like ancient bushmen under indescribable circumstances, facing the challenge to survive and, at the same time, the threat to be detected. On the radio they follow the war events in Europe. Their adventure comes to an end when Hermann Korn starts suffering seriously from malnutrition.

Cast
 Jason Connery as  Henno Martin
 Rupert Graves as  Hermann Korn
 Joss Ackland as  Col. Johnston
 Kate Normington as  Brigitte
 John Carson as  Harding
 Franz Dobrowsky as  De Kock
 Michael Brunner as  Zoeller
 Gavin Hood as  Willi
 Will Bernard as  Policeman
 Glenn Swart as  Grobbelaar

References

External links
 

1992 films
1992 drama films
1990s English-language films
English-language South African films
English-language Irish films
Films directed by Regardt van den Bergh
Films set in Namibia
British drama films
Films shot in Namibia
Irish drama films
South African drama films
World War II films based on actual events
1990s British films